Burnley Central railway station is a station in the town of Burnley, Lancashire and is on the East Lancashire Line.  It is managed by Northern, which also provides its passenger service.

Following the singling of the track in December 1986, Burnley Central has one platform in use, together with a small ticket office, waiting area and public address facility. There are information boards at the entrance of the station and in the booking hall, along with passenger information screens on the platform.  The booking office is staffed on weekday mornings and early afternoons only - at other times, tickets can be purchased from a ticket vending machine on the concourse. It is fully accessible to disabled travellers, with a ramp from the entrance to the waiting room/ticket office & platform.

History

It was opened by the East Lancashire Railway in 1848 as part of its route from Bury and Blackburn to Colne, where an end-on junction was made with the Leeds and Bradford Extension Railway line from Skipton that had been completed several months earlier. The service from Colne through the station to Manchester Victoria via Accrington and Bury was well used from the outset by the owners of the local cotton mills, who travelled from their homes in the area to make their purchases of raw cotton at the Royal Exchange several times each week.  It was also possible to travel from the station by direct train to Blackpool, Liverpool and Skipton and even through to London Euston via Blackburn, Manchester Victoria and Stockport.

However the cutbacks of the 1960s affected the station badly, with through trains to Manchester via Bury ending in 1964 (two years before the withdrawal of the Accrington to Bury service) and those to Liverpool in 1969 whilst the line to Skipton was closed to all traffic in 1970.  This left the station on a -long dead-end branch line from Rose Grove to Colne, although the line remained double as far as Nelson until December 1986. The eastbound line and platform (used by trains towards Colne) was taken out of use thereafter and the station signal box closed - the track was subsequently lifted and the box and platform demolished a few years later.  Only part of the remaining (former westbound) platform is now used by passenger trains - the rest is fenced off and overgrown.  Immediately to the west, the line passes above the centre of the town on Bank Top viaduct as it heads towards Gannow Junction.

Despite the cutbacks, the station was rebuilt in 1965, with the ground floor at street level and the first floor at platform level, providing a booking hall, toilets, waiting rooms, stationmaster's office, parcels office and left luggage office.

Services

On weekdays, there is an hourly service from Burnley Central to Colne (eastbound) and Preston (westbound).

Northern formerly ran an hourly Sunday service each way, after taking over operations in April 2016.  In the current winter 2022 timetable however, this has dropped to two-hourly.

References

Sources
Frater, A. (1983) Stopping Train Britain - A Railway Odyssey, Hodder & Staughton Ltd, London. 
Marshall, J. (1981) Forgotten Railways North-West England, David & Charles (Publishers) Ltd, Newton Abbott. 
Suggitt, G. (2004 reprint), Lost Railways of Lancashire, Countryside Books, Newbury,

External links

Railway stations in Burnley
DfT Category E stations
Former Lancashire and Yorkshire Railway stations
Railway stations in Great Britain opened in 1848
Northern franchise railway stations
1848 establishments in England